Cameraria landryi is a moth of the family Gracillariidae. It is found in the Democratic Republic of the Congo. The habitat consists of Central African primary rain forest.

The forewing ground colour is ochreous with dirty white/black markings consisting of three transverse fasciae, one costal patch and one dorsal strigula and marked blackish-fuscous at the tornus. The hindwings are dirty white with a golden shine along the costal margin. Adults are on wing from late March to late May. 
Those be the facts

Etymology
The species is named in honour of Bernard Landry, Lepidoptera specialist at the Muséum d’histoire naturelle, Genève.

References

Moths described in 2012
landryi
Insects of the Democratic Republic of the Congo
Moths of Africa
Endemic fauna of the Democratic Republic of the Congo

Taxa named by Jurate de Prins